February 13 - Eastern Orthodox liturgical calendar - February 15

All fixed commemorations below are observed on February 27 by Orthodox Churches on the Old Calendar.

For February 14th, Orthodox Churches on the Old Calendar commemorate the Saints listed on February 1.

Saints

 Saint Peter II, Patriarch of Alexandria (380)
 Venerable Maron of Syria, hermit of Cyrrhus (c. 433)
 Venerable Auxentius of Bithynia, monastic (c. 470)
 Venerable Abraham of Charres, Bishop of Charres in Mesopotamia (5th century)
 Venerable Cyril, Equal-to-the-Apostles, Teacher of the Slavs (869)
 Hieromartyr Philemon of Gaza, Bishop of Gaza (10th century).

Pre-Schism Western saints

 Saint Eleuchadius, a Greek, converted by St Apollinaris of Ravenna in Italy, and succeeded St Adheritus as third Bishop of that city (112)
 Martyrs Vitalis, Felicula and Zeno, early martyrs in Rome.
 Saint Valentine the Presbyter of Rome, under Claudius II (c. 270)  (see also: July 6, July 30)
 Hieromartyr Valentine, Bishop of Interamna Nahars, Terni, in Italy (c. 273)  (see also: July 30; April 24)
 Martyrs Proculus, Ephebus and Apollonius, disciples of Hieromartyr Valentine, Bishop of Interamna, Terni, in Italy (c. 273)
 Martyrs Bassus, Anthony, and Protolicus, at Alexandria.
 Martyr Agatho, Priest, and Companions, at Alexandria.
 Saint Nostrianus, Bishop of Naples in Italy and a valiant opponent of Arianism and Pelagianism (c. 450)
 Saint Theodosius, Bishop of Vaison in France and predecessor of St Quinidius (554)
 Saint Conran, a holy bishop of the Orkney Islands.
 Saint Antoninus of Sorrento, a monk in one of the daughter monasteries of Monte Cassino in Italy, became Abbot of St Agrippinus (830)

Post-Schism Orthodox saints

 Venerable Isaac, recluse of the Kiev Caves Monastery (c. 1090)
 New Martyr Nicholas of Corinth (1554)
 New Monk-martyr Damian of Philotheou and Kissavos, at Larissa (1568)
 New Martyr George the Tailor, of Mytilene, at Constantinople (1693)
 Venerable Auxentios the Ascetic, of Mount Katirlion near Nicomedia on the Propontis, Wonderworker (c. 1757)
 Saint Hilarion the Georgian (the New) of Imereti and Mt. Athos (1864)
 Saint Raphael (Hawaweeny), Bishop of Brooklyn (1915)  (Old style date see also: February 27)

New martyrs and confessors

 New Hieromartyr Nikolaos of Trebizond, Bishop of Amisos (1920)
 New Hieromartyr Onesimus (Pylaev), Bishop of Tula (1937)
 New Hieromartyr Tryphon, Deacon (1938)

Other commemorations

 12 Greeks who built the Dormition Cathedral in the Kiev Caves, Far Caves, Lavra (11th century)
 Translation of the relics of Martyrs Prince Michael and his counselor Theodore, of Chernigov (1578)
 Repose of Archimandrite Barsanuphius of Valaam and Morocco (1952)
 Repose of Righteous Barbara (Arkhangelskaya) the Recluse, of Ufa (1966)
 Repose of Venerable Elder Ephraim of Katounakia (1998) (see also: February 27)

Icon gallery

Notes

References

Sources
 February 14 / 27. Orthodox Calendar (Pravoslavie.ru).
 February 27 / 14. Holy Trinity Russian Orthodox Church (A parish of the Patriarchate of Moscow).
 February 14. OCA - The Lives of the Saints.
 The Autonomous Orthodox Metropolia of Western Europe and the Americas. St. Hilarion Calendar of Saints for the year of our Lord 2004. St. Hilarion Press (Austin, TX). p. 15.
 The Fourteenth Day of the Month of February. Orthodoxy in China.
 February 14. Latin Saints of the Orthodox Patriarchate of Rome.
 The Roman Martyrology. Transl. by the Archbishop of Baltimore. Last Edition, According to the Copy Printed at Rome in 1914. Revised Edition, with the Imprimatur of His Eminence Cardinal Gibbons. Baltimore: John Murphy Company, 1916. pp. 47–48.
 Rev. Richard Stanton. A Menology of England and Wales, or, Brief Memorials of the Ancient British and English Saints Arranged According to the Calendar, Together with the Martyrs of the 16th and 17th Centuries. London: Burns & Oates, 1892. pp. 68–69.
Greek Sources
 Great Synaxaristes:  14 Φεβρουαρίου. Μεγασ Συναξαριστησ.
  Συναξαριστής. 14 Φεβρουαρίου. Ecclesia.gr. (H Εκκλησια Τησ Ελλαδοσ).
Russian Sources
  27 февраля (14 февраля). Православная Энциклопедия под редакцией Патриарха Московского и всея Руси Кирилла (электронная версия). (Orthodox Encyclopedia - Pravenc.ru).

February in the Eastern Orthodox calendar